Torrisdale is the name of several places:
Torrisdale, Argyll, in Kintyre, in Scotland
Torrisdale, Sutherland, in Scotland
Torresdale, Philadelphia, formerly known as Torrisdale